Novokuznetskaya is a Moscow Metro station on the Zamoskvoretskaya Line.
The station was opened on 20 November 1943.

History 

Construction of the station began shortly after the launch of the second stage in 1938. Despite World War II the station was opened on time. Later in 1978 the platform was lengthened. This part is in a more modern style than the rest of the station.

Design 

The station honors the Soviet fighting men with its heavy ornamentation. The architects, I. Taranov and N. Bykova, won a USSR State Prize for their design.

The decorations include seven octagonal ceiling mosaics by Vladimir Frolov on the theme of wartime industry and bas-reliefs running along the base of the ceiling (by artists N.V. Tomsky, A.E. Zelensky, S.M. Rabinovich, and N.M. Shtamm) depicting the soldiers of the Red Army in combat. The pink and white marble pylons are also decorated with cast-bronze portraits of Russian war heroes like Mikhail Kutuzov and Alexander Nevsky. Floor lamps, long since replaced with more up-to-date lighting in other Metro stations, still give Novokuznetskaya an atmosphere of brooding shadow.

There is an urban legend that the station's ornate benches were made of Carrara marble taken from the Cathedral of Christ the Saviour just before it was demolished (in 1931), but it is not true, and the marble was from Ural, not Italy.

Exits 

Novokuznetskaya's round entrance vestibule is located off Pyatnitskaya Street, north of the intersection with Klimentovsky lane.

Transfers
From this station it is possible to transfer to Tretyakovskaya, a cross-platform station serving both the Kaluzhsko-Rizhskaya Line and the Kalininskaya Line.

External links
metro.ru
mymetro.ru
KartaMetro.info — Station location and exits on Moscow map (English/Russian)

References

Moscow Metro stations
Railway stations in Russia opened in 1943
Zamoskvoretskaya Line
Railway stations located underground in Russia
Cultural heritage monuments of regional significance in Moscow